New Amsterdam is an American television drama which aired for eight episodes in 2008 on Fox. The series starred Nikolaj Coster-Waldau as "John Amsterdam" (real name Johann van der Zee), an immortal Dutch man born in 1607, who has lived in New York City on and off since he was 14 years old, and who is a homicide detective in the present day. The series was nominated for an Emmy for Main Title Design.

Premise and plot
John Amsterdam (Nikolaj Coster-Waldau) is an NYPD homicide detective who is 400 years old, but has the appearance of a 35-year-old. He was a Dutch soldier in Manhattan in the year 1642, when he stepped in front of a sword to save the life of a Native American girl during the massacre of her tribe. The girl in turn rescued Amsterdam by weaving a spell that conferred immortality upon him. It was also prophesied that he would not age until he finds his one true love, and only then will he become whole and ready for mortality. Flashbacks in different episodes of the show reveal Amsterdam's centuries of life since, using many names, though usually retaining "John", marked by loss as his friends, lovers, children (63), and dogs gradually grow old and die. Amsterdam is a recovering alcoholic who regularly attends Alcoholics Anonymous meetings, having remained sober since 1965. In his lifetime he has joined the Army three times, in addition to the Coast Guard, Marines, and Navy. He stated that he never joined the Air Force because he "doesn't like heights". He has taught history at a university, served as a physician during the American Civil War, was a furniture maker at the turn of the 20th century, a portrait painter just before the outbreak of World War I, and by 1941 an attorney. At some point he attended Columbia University and served in the CIA. (See below for a detailed timeline.)

Amsterdam's quest to find his "true love" drives the series. But in each episode as a policeman he has crimes to solve, which he does using his deep and often personal knowledge of history, depicted as flashbacks. Though estranged from and unknown to most of his many descendants, except his 65-year-old son Omar, he tries to keep track of them and aids them when possible.

The title sequence is a time lapse series of images of the place where Amsterdam received his "gift", from the forests and Native American camps of the 17th century which evolves into modern Times Square in the city of New York.

Cast and characters

 Nikolaj Coster-Waldau as John Amsterdam, a New York homicide detective (badge number 9298) who will become mortal again after he finds his one true love. As a side effect of the immortality ritual, John has a rare Native American blood type (RR), with lethal levels of lead (120 μg/dL). His blood also clots quickly, with a platelet level ten times normal, despite very low levels of factor VIII. Later Dr. Dillane speculates that he may have pluripotent stem cells. He was born Johann van der Zee on June 1, 1607 in Amsterdam, Holland. Amsterdam is only the latest of the aliases John has used, changing identities as often as once a decade.
 Zuleikha Robinson as Eva Marquez, Amsterdam's new partner. She attended SUNY Binghamton. Her brother is also a police officer, and her father is police Chief Eddie Marquez. Her mother is a history teacher at Queens College.
 Alexie Gilmore as Dr. Sara Millay Dillane, a Cornell graduate who lives in the West Village, within walking distance of St. Francis Hospital where she is an emergency room physician. Dr. Dillane pronounces Amsterdam dead after a heart attack, and he is convinced that she is "the one" (his soulmate). This is complicated by the revelation that she has been married for four years to Robert Camp, although they are currently separated. Sara initiates a divorce because her husband was having an ongoing affair.
 Stephen Henderson as Omar York, who owns a jazz club named Omar's: Bar–Grill, and is John's 65-year-old son with schoolteacher Lily Rae Brown, an African American woman. He is named after Omar Khayyám.

Episodes

Production
New Amsterdam was created by Allan Loeb and Christian Taylor, who also served as executive producers alongside David Manson, Leslie Holleran, Steven Pearl and Lasse Hallström. The latter also directed the pilot. Produced by Laha Films, Regency Television, Sarabande Productions and Scarlet Fire Entertainment, the series was greenlit and given a thirteen-episode order on May 11, 2007. The series was scheduled to premiere in the fall of 2007, consequently airing on Tuesday nights at 8:00/7:00c on Fox, but it was held as a mid-season replacement and began airing in March 2008.

On Tuesday, October 16, 2007, an article in The Hollywood Reporter stated that production on New Amsterdam had been stopped for an indefinite period, with "seven episodes of the series in the can". The article also mentioned that Fox decided to review the series and then decide whether or not to order new episodes, something that the article writer asserted was considered to be unlikely. A pre-air version of the Pilot episode was leaked onto internet file-sharing services on December 2, 2007.

On January 23, 2008, Fox resumed airing commercials for the show stated "coming soon". Following the premiere another preview episode aired on March 6, 2008 (at 9:00 PM/8:00 PM Central), before the series moved to its regular timeslot on March 10, 2008. The series also aired on Global in Canada. Global ran the first episode one hour before the U.S. broadcast, and the second episode one day before the U.S. broadcast.

On May 11, 2008, it was announced that Fox had decided to cancel New Amsterdam. The show was nominated for a 2008 Emmy Award for Main Title Design, but lost to Mad Men.

Timeline

As of the pilot, John has had 609 girlfriends, a few wives, and 63 children. His current dog is Thirty-six. John keeps a detailed family tree of all his wives and known descendants. His military service includes "the Army three times, Marines, Navy, Coast Guard...not the Air Force - don't like heights."

John's descendants shown or mentioned in the series include:
 John's daughter, Maggie (born c. 1891), known as "Em". In 1941 she is working as John's secretary.
 John's son, Roosevelt "Rosie" Amsterdam (born 1894).
 Rosie's son, Theo Spoor. The retired boss of one of New York's mob families. The Spoor family owns Dutch's Painting of Alice, which they keep at the Spoor Brewery.
 Theo's grandson, Nicholas Spoor. The current boss of the mob family, and an FBI informant.
 Theo's grandson, Piers Spoor. Murdered by Nicholas to hide the FBI details.
 Theo's grandson, Alex Spoor. Murdered by Nicholas to hide the FBI details.
 John's son, Omar York (born 1942).
 Omar's daughter, Hallie.
 Hallie's young son, Corey.

Reception

Works with a similar premise 
The background idea behind the show, a present-day immortal who changes aliases to avoid detection, has been used elsewhere. After hearing about the upcoming series, author Pete Hamill alleged that the show has similarities to the plot of his 2003 novel, Forever, but producer David Manson claimed he had no knowledge of the book until after filming had wrapped.

Other productions with similar foundations are the 2007 film The Man from Earth (written in 1998); the ongoing Highlander franchise, which began in 1986; Forever Knight, a 1992 Canadian show about a vampire detective (which includes in each episode a flashback to previous years); and Forever, a U.S. television series that aired in 2014. The premise was used as early as 1969, in the Star Trek episode "Requiem for Methuselah".

An unrelated 2007 book also called New Amsterdam, by the fantasy and science fiction writer Elizabeth Bear, features an immortal vampire detective partnering with a forensic sorcerer to solve occult crimes in an alternate universe. Many of the issues John deals with are covered by Robert A. Heinlein's Lazarus Long series of books, specifically the melancholy of immortality and the sense of loss that accumulated through the death of loved ones (after Time Enough for Love).

References

Episode sources:

External links
 
 

2008 American television series debuts
2008 American television series endings
2000s American crime drama television series
2000s American police procedural television series
English-language television shows
Fictional portrayals of the New York City Police Department
Fox Broadcasting Company original programming
Serial drama television series
American time travel television series
Television series by 20th Century Fox Television
Television shows set in New York City